David John MacRae Carnegie, 14th Earl of Northesk (3 November 1954 – 28 March 2010), styled Lord Rosehill between 1975 and 1994, was a British hereditary peer, landowner and member of the House of Lords.

Background
David Carnegie was the second son of Robert Carnegie, 13th Earl of Northesk, and Jean Margaret MacRae.

Political career
Lord Northesk inherited the earldom on his father's death in 1994, his elder brother having been accidentally drowned in infancy. 
He thereby became a member of the House of Lords, where he sat on the Conservative benches. He was later one of the 92 peers elected to remain in the House following the passing of the House of Lords Act 1999. In the House of Lords, he spoke on topics relating to civil liberties and privacy, and spoke out against the Identity Cards Act 2006 and new online copyright laws such as those contained in the Digital Economy Act 2010.

Family
Lord Northesk married Jacqueline Dundas Reid in 1979. They had four children:

 Alexander Robert Macrae Carnegie, Lord Rosehill (born 16 November 1980, committed suicide 31 August 2001)
 Lady Sarah Louise Mary Carnegie (born 29 October 1982)
 Lady Fiona Jean Elizabeth Carnegie (born 24 March 1987)
 Lady Sophie Margaret Jean Carnegie (born 9 January 1990)

In 2001, his eldest child and only son Lord Rosehill, a psychiatric patient, shot himself in the head with his father's gun whilst on leave from hospital at the family's farm in West Sussex. He was 20 years old.

Northesk died at the age of 55 from cancer and was succeeded in the earldom by his eighth cousin once removed, Patrick Carnegy. His vacated seat in the House of Lords triggered a by-election for a Conservative hereditary peer to replace him.

References

Northesk, Who's Who 2010, A & C Black, 2010; online edn, Oxford University Press, December 2009; online edn, Nov 2009, accessed 30 March 2010.
David John MacRae Carnegie, 14th Earl of Northesk,  biodata at The Peerage.com

Earl of Northesk on the Open Rights Group wiki

External links

1954 births
2010 deaths
Conservative Party (UK) hereditary peers
David 14
Deaths from cancer in the United Kingdom
Younger sons of earls
Hereditary peers elected under the House of Lords Act 1999